The  Lauenburg Lakes  Nature Park was founded in  and lies in the district of Lauenburg in the southeastern part of the German state of  Schleswig-Holstein. It is right on the border with the state of Mecklenburg-Vorpommern in the Schleswig-Holstein Uplands, a Young Drift moraine landscape that formed during the Weichselian glaciation of the last ice age.

Location and significance 
The Lauenburg Lakes Nature Park, there are 40 lakes in total, borders directly on the Mecklenburg biosphere reserve of Schaalsee and, together, they form a large nature reserve along the former Inner German Border.

The largest lakes in the nature park are the Ratzeburger See and the Schaalsee, which are linked together by the Schaalsee Canal that begins near Salem.

Within the nature park are the district towns of Ratzeburg and Mölln as well as the Hellbach Valley. The Old Salt Road from Lüneburg to Lübeck runs through the nature park – at several places, such as Fredeburg, still as a medieval route - the Alte Salzstraße. The nature park is roughly bordered to the west between Berkenthin and Büchen by the Elbe-Lübeck Canal. The Naturparkweg nature trail runs through the park and links it to the other four nature parks in Schleswig-Holstein.

The watershed between the North and Baltic Seas also runs through the nature park.

See also 
Other lakes in the nature park: Behlendorfer See | Garrensee | Pinnsee
 List of nature parks in Germany

References

External links 

 Lauenburg Lakes Nature Park

Nature parks in Schleswig-Holstein
Herzogtum Lauenburg
1961 establishments in West Germany
Protected areas established in 1961